An American Romance is a 1944 American epic drama film directed and produced by King Vidor, who also wrote the screen story. Shot in Technicolor, the film stars Brian Donlevy and Ann Richards and is narrated by Horace McNally. The film is also known as The American Miracle.

Plot
European immigrant Stefan Dubechek arrives in America in the 1890s and becomes involved in the steel industry. He eventually becomes an automobile manufacturer, and later, in World War II, a plane manufacturer. The last four minutes of the film show B-17 Flying Fortress being built at Douglas Aircraft factory where the vast majority of the workers are women.

Cast
 Brian Donlevy as Stefan Dubechek/Steve Dangos
 Ann Richards as Anna O'Rourke Dangos
 Walter Abel as Howard Clinton
 John Qualen as Anton Dubechek
 Horace McNally as Teddy Roosevelt Dangos/Narrator
 Mary McLeod as Tina Dangos
 Bob Lowell as George Dangos
 Fred Brady as Abraham Lincoln Dangos
 Billy Lechner as Joe Chandler, Jr.
 Jerry Shane as Bob Chandler
 Harold Landon as Joe
 J. M. Kerrigan as Charlie O'Rourke

Production
The film was part of a trilogy directed and produced by King Vidor consisting of war, wheat and steel. His films on war and wheat were The Big Parade (1925) and Our Daily Bread (1934). This was to be his steel industry epic film. Vidor came up with the story which he proposed to Eddie Mannix.  Vidor then sent a telegram to author Louis Adamic, who wrote on the topic of immigration and labor.  The screenplay was ultimately credited to Herbert Dalmas and William Ludwig, representing a long list of contributing writers, including John Fante, and alternate titles. The film's working titles were America, This Is America, An American Story, American Miracle and The Magic Land.

Vidor initially wanted to cast Spencer Tracy as Steve Dangos, Ingrid Bergman as Anna and Joseph Cotten as the lead character's friend Howard Clinton. All three were unavailable, so cast in their place were Brian Donlevy as Dangos and Walter Abel as Howard Clinton. Vidor later said that he felt that Donlevy was miscast as Steve Dangos because he was known for playing "blunt and blustering" characters. Frances Gifford and Ann Sothern were reportedly considered for the role of Anna but Australian actress Ann Richards was chosen  after principal photography began in April 1943.

Vidor used several different locations for exterior and industrial shots. He shot footage of factories and mines in Hibbing, Minnesota, the dock in Duluth, Minnesota and the Ford River A&O Rouge Plant in Dearborn, Michigan. Atmosphere and background shots were filmed in Lake Superior. Additional industrial shots of the Carnegie Illinois Steel Works factory in Chicago and the Indiana Steel Plant in Gary, Indiana were also filmed. For a racing scene, Vidor used footage filmed at the Indianapolis 500 in Speedway, Indiana. Other scenes were filmed at the Chrysler automobile factory in Detroit, the Consolidated Plant in San Diego and the Douglas Aircraft Company in Long Beach, California. Vidor also recalled filming in Wilmington, California. Background footage of a blast furnace used in the film was shot in Irontown, Utah.

An American Romance took fifteen months to complete and its final budget totaled at $3,000,000.

Reception
The film was shown at a preview screening in Inglewood, California. The original cut was 151 minutes which Louis B. Mayer praised but still chose to remove thirty minutes after complaints from theater managers that the film was too long. It is unknown if the edited footage still survives. Vidor was not happy with the cuts as he felt they hurt the story.

An American Romance made its world premiere in Cincinnati, Ohio on October 11, 1944, opened in New York City on November 12, 1944, and in Los Angeles on December 13, 1944. The film received mixed reviews and was a financial failure. King Vidor refused to work for MGM again. He later wrote about the film in his 1953 autobiography A Tree Is a Tree:

I was determined to tell the story of steel from the viewpoint of an eager immigrant in 'An American Romance' ...  When the picture was previewed in Inglewood, Louis B. Mayer came to me on the sidewalk in front of the theater, put his arm around my shoulders and said, 'I've just seen the greatest picture our company ever made'. However, an order came from the New York office to cut half an hour. They cut the human elements of the story instead of the documentary sections, explaining that this was the only way a half hour could be taken out without complications in the musical soundtrack. In other words, the film was edited according to the soundtrack and not according to the inherent story values. At the lowest emotional level I have reached since I have been on Hollywood, I went to my office, packed up and moved out of the studio. The picture was not a box office success. Many of the inhabitants of Hollywood and Beverly Hills have never seen the film and many do not even know it was made. I spent 3 years of my life on the project and MGM spent close to $3,000,000.

MGM recorded a loss of $1.7 million on the film.

In February 2020, the film was shown at the 70th Berlin International Film Festival, as part of a retrospective dedicated to King Vidor's career.

See also
List of American films of 1944

References

External links
 
 
 
 

1940s historical drama films
1944 films
American historical drama films
1940s English-language films
American epic films
Films directed by King Vidor
Films set in the 1890s
Films shot in Chicago
Films shot in Indiana
Films shot in Los Angeles
Films shot in Michigan
Films shot in Minnesota
Films shot in San Diego
Films shot in Utah
Metro-Goldwyn-Mayer films
Films with screenplays by William Ludwig
Films scored by Nathaniel Shilkret
American black-and-white films
1944 drama films
1940s American films